Bobby McFerrin is the debut album by Bobby McFerrin, released in 1982.

Track listing
All songs written by Bobby McFerrin except where noted
 "Dance with Me" (Johanna Hall, John Hall) – 4:08
 "Feline" – 5:08
 "You've Really Got a Hold on Me" (Smokey Robinson) – 3:53
 "Moondance" (Van Morrison) – 5:20
 "All Feets Can Dance" – 2:15
 "Sightless Bird" – 6:26
 "Peace" (Horace Silver) – 4:38
 "Jubilee" – 4:49
 "Hallucinations" (Bud Powell) – 2:21
 "Chicken" – 3:14

Personnel
Bobby McFerrin - vocals, backing vocals, Fender Rhodes, arrangements, liner notes
H. B. Bennett  – drums
Joe Caro  – guitar
Steve Erquiaga  – guitar
Stu Feldman  – bass
Victor Feldman – piano, Fender Rhodes
John Guerin  – drums
Randy Jackson  – bass
Kenny Karsh  – guitar 
Larry Klein  – bass
Peter Maunu  – guitar
Kenneth Nash  – percussion
James Preston  – drums
John Siegler  – bass
Phoebe Snow  – vocals
Frank Vilardi  – drums

Production
Nicholas Ten Broeck  – Arranger
Ron Coro  – Art Direction
Bert de Coteaux  – Executive Producer
Maureen Droney  – Assistant Engineer
David Frazer  – Assistant Engineer
Linda Goldstein  – Producer
Jerry Hudgins  – Engineer
Leslie Ann Jones  – Engineer, Mixing
Ken Kessie  – Engineer
Kosh  – Design
Fred Miller  – Engineer
Roger Ressmeyer  – Photography
Elliot Scheiner  – Engineer
Paul Stubblebine  – Mastering

Chart performance

References

Bobby McFerrin albums
1982 albums
Elektra/Musician albums